Adaphaenura is a genus of moths of the family Noctuidae. The genus was erected by George Hampson in 1905.

Species
Adaphaenura minuscula (Butler, 1882) Madagascar
Adaphaenura ratovosoni Viette, 1973 Madagascar

References

Cuculliinae
Noctuoidea genera